The Premier Cup is a Group 3 Thoroughbred handicap horse race in Hong Kong, run at Sha Tin over 1400 metres in June.

Horses rated 95 and above are qualified to enter the race.

Records

Most successful horse (2 wins):
 Able One – 2010, 2012

Leading jockey (2 wins):
 João Moreira – Sun Jewellery (2016), Thewizardofoz (2017)

Leading trainer (4 wins):
 John Moore – Able One (2008 & 2010), Sterling City (2013), Secret Sham (2015)

Winners

See also
 List of Hong Kong horse races

References 
Racing Post:
 Racing Information of Prince Jewellery & Watch Premier Cup (2011/12)
 The Hong Kong Jockey Club 

Horse races in Hong Kong